Sheikh Ibrahim Cudjoe Quaye born 30 July 1937 is a Ghanaian politician who represented the constituency of Ayawaso Central in the Parliament of Ghana from 1996 to 2011. He has also served as Regional Minister of the Greater Accra Region under Kufuor's government from 2001 to 2009.

Early life and education 
Quaye was born 30 July 1937. He hails from La-Accra in the Accra Region of Ghana. He  is a product of the Cambridge School. He acquired a certificate in 1958. He is also a product of Rapid Results College. He acquired a Diploma in Business Administration from the college. This was in 1962. In 1967, he acquired a Diploma in Journalism from the same college.

Career 
Quaye is a publisher by profession.

Political career 
Quaye began his political career in 1969 when he became the parliamentary candidate for the Progress Party (PP) to represent the Bawku West constituency prior to the commencement of the 1969 Ghanaian parliamentary election.

Quaye is a member of the New Patriotic Party. He was elected into office in the 1996 Ghanaian General Elections and became a member of the second Parliament of the 4th Republic of Ghana to represent Ayawaso Central Constituency of the Greater Accra Region, and he assumed office in January 1997. He was re-elected to represent in the 3rd, 4th and 5th Parliament consecutively. He also served as the Greater Accra Regional Minister under the government of John Kufuor.

Elections  
Quaye was elected as the member of parliament for the  Ayawaso Central constituency of the Greater Accra Region of Ghana in the 2004 Ghanaian general elections. He won on the ticket of the New Patriotic Party.  His constituency was a part of the 16 parliamentary seats out of 27 seats won by the New Patriotic Party in that election for the Greater Accra Region. The New Patriotic Party won a majority total of 128 parliamentary seats out of 230 seats.  He was elected with 36,021 votes out of 67,404 total valid votes cast. This was equivalent to 53.4% of total valid votes cast. He was elected over Zalia Seidu of the People's National Convention, Mariama Sinare of the  National Democratic Congress, Christiana Martey of the Convention People's Party and Charles Boateng an independent candidate. These obtained 858, 29,360, 482  and 683 votes respectively of total valid votes cast. These were equivalent to 1.3%, 43.6%, 0.7% and 1.0% respectively of total valid votes cast.

In 2008, he  won the  general elections on the ticket of the New Patriotic Party. His constituency was part of the 18 parliamentary seats out of 27 seats won by the New Patriotic Party in that election in the Greater Accra Region. The New Patriotic Party won a minority total of 108 parliamentary seats out of 230 seats. He was elected with 30,915 votes out of 62,960 total valid votes cast. This was equivalent to 49.1% of total valid votes cast. He was selected over Kwasi Ofei Agyemang of the National Democratic Congress, Zalia Seidu of the People's National Convention, Daniel Kofi Aidoo of the Convention People's Party and Benjamin Bediako of the  Democratic Freedom Party. These obtained 30,058, 622,  1,160  and 205  votes respectively of the total valid votes cast. These were equivalent to 47.74%, 0.99%, 1,160% and 0.33% respectively of total valid votes cast.

Personal life 
Quaye is a Muslim. He is married with five children.

See also 

 Busia government
List of MPs elected in the 1969 Ghanaian parliamentary election

References

1937 births
Living people
Ghanaian Muslims
New Patriotic Party politicians
Ghanaian MPs 1969–1972
Ghanaian MPs 1993–1997
Ghanaian MPs 1997–2001
Ghanaian MPs 2001–2005
Ghanaian MPs 2005–2009
Ghanaian MPs 2009–2013
Cambridge College alumni
Progress Party (Ghana) politicians
Ghanaian publishers (people)